Harold McPherson Smith was a Scottish professional footballer who made over 140 appearances in the Football League for Clapton Orient as an inside forward. He also played in the Scottish League for Dundee and Raith Rovers.

Career statistics

References 

English Football League players
1911 births
Association football inside forwards
Scottish footballers
Footballers from Dundee
Scottish Football League players
Year of death missing
Dundee F.C. players
Raith Rovers F.C. players
Leyton Orient F.C. players
Dundee United F.C. players